Aleksy Konieczny (born 11 July 1925) was a Polish bobsledder. He competed in the two-man and the four-man events at the 1956 Winter Olympics.

References

External links
 

1925 births
Possibly living people
Polish male bobsledders
Olympic bobsledders of Poland
Bobsledders at the 1956 Winter Olympics
People from Leszno